Jiřetín pod Bukovou (until 1950 Jiřetín) is a municipality and village in Jablonec nad Nisou District in the Liberec Region of the Czech Republic. It has about 500 inhabitants.

Notable people
Daniel Swarovski (1862–1956), Bohemian-Austrian glass cutter, jeweler and entrepreneur

References

Villages in Jablonec nad Nisou District